Sokimex (or SOKIMEX) (Sok Kong Import Export Company) is a company based in Cambodia.  The company is involved in petroleum product import, infrastructure development, hotel management, and an airline.

History

Sokimex was founded in 1990 by Oknha Sok Kong, an ethnic Vietnamese Cambodian businessman. The main offices are located in Phnom Penh.

The Sokha Hotel Group opened the Sokha Beach Resort in Sihanouk Ville on 8 April 2004, followed by the opening of Sokha Angkor Resort in Siem Reap on 8 December 2005. Sokha Club hotel is a boutique hotel opened in Phnom Penh on 28 August 2008. Thansur Bokor Highland Resort is affiliated with Sokha Hotel opened in Kampot on 3 May 2011.

Sokimex also used to run the Angkor World Heritage Site.

References

External links
Sokimex Group
Sokha Hotels & Resorts
Sokimex article at International Monetary Fund (IMF)

Companies of Cambodia
Cambodian companies established in 1990
Holding companies established in 1990
Companies based in Phnom Penh